The 1999 Supercoppa Italiana was a match played by the 1998–99 Serie A winners Milan and 1998–99 Coppa Italia winners Parma. It took place on 21 August 1999 at the San Siro in Milan, Italy. Parma won the match 2–1 to earn their first and to date only Supercoppa.

Match details

1999
Supercoppa 1999
Supercoppa 1999
Supercoppa Italiana